Antje ("Anne") Elisabeth van Schuppen (born 11 October 1960 in Doornspijk, Gelderland) is a former long-distance runner from the Netherlands, who represented her native country at the 1996 Summer Olympics in Atlanta, Georgia. There she finished in 41st place, clocking 2:40:46. She won the Rotterdam Marathon on 18 April 1993 in a time of 2:34:15. She won the City-Pier-City Loop half marathon in the Hague in 1992.

Achievements

References
 Personal Website

1960 births
Living people
Dutch female long-distance runners
Dutch female marathon runners
Athletes (track and field) at the 1996 Summer Olympics
Olympic athletes of the Netherlands
People from Elburg
20th-century Dutch women
20th-century Dutch people
21st-century Dutch women
Sportspeople from Gelderland